The Three Amigos were a band in the late 1990s and early 2000s, most famous for their cover of "Louie Louie".

Biography
The Three Amigos first single was their cover of "Louie Louie". Released in July 1999, it reached #15 in the UK Singles Chart. The band's logo on the single cover paid tribute to the logo of The Kingsmen, one of the first bands to cover "Louie Louie". The single also featured a remix by The Wiseguys.

The Three Amigos were made up of Dylan Amlot, Milroy Nadarajah, and Marc Williams.

Since the breakup of the band Dylan Amlot has continued to DJ, while Milroy Nadarajah turned to crime and, in 2004, was jailed for seven years for supplying cocaine to a London drug gang.

Discography

EPs
 The Three Amigos Ride Again (Thumpin Vinyl, 2000)

Singles

Remixes
 1998 "I Like It Like That" (The Miami Allstars)
 2002 "No Transmission" (LHB)

References

British dance music groups